Welt am Sonntag (German for World on Sunday) is a German Sunday newspaper published in Germany.

History and profile
Welt am Sonntag was established in 1948. The paper is published by Axel Springer SE. Its head office is in Berlin, and it has local editions for Berlin, Hamburg, Munich and Düsseldorf.

It is the Sunday edition of the daily Die Welt. It includes sections on politics, sport, economics, finance, culture, style, travel, and real estate.

In 2009, Welt am Sonntag was recognized as one of the "World’s Best-Designed Newspapers" by the Society for News Design, along with four other newspapers. In 2012 the paper was named European Newspaper of the Year in the category of nationwide newspapers. In 2013 Welt am Sonntag won the same award, but this time in the category of weekly newspapers.

During the second quarter of 1992 Welt am Sonntag had a circulation of 420,000 copies. Its circulation was 381,000 copies in 1997, and 532,000 in 2014.

Editors
2004–2008: Alan Posener

References

External links 
 Welt am Sonntag website
 RSS Feed

1948 establishments in Germany
Axel Springer SE
German-language newspapers
Newspapers published in Berlin
Publications established in 1948
Sunday newspapers
Weekly newspapers published in Germany
Die Welt